Āloka David Smith (born David Smith, 10 June 1946, died 31 July 2015) was a lay Buddhist practitioner and teacher of the DharmaMind Buddhist Group.

Biography
Āloka David Smith was born and raised in Oxford, England. His dharma training began in his twenties with Zen, practicing with the Venerable Myokyo-ni, a teacher from the Rinzai school, at the Buddhist Society Zen Centre in London. He trained with the Venerable Myokyo-ni for over five years, before travelling to Sri Lanka in 1980. He then spent three years living and practicing as a Theravada monk under the guidance of the Venerable Dhammaloka Maha Thera. It was during his time in Sri Lanka, in 1981, that his spiritual breakthrough took place. This event and the experiences that followed it are the subject of his first book, A Record of Awakening, published in 1999. This period of his training is discussed in an interview with Conscious TV.

After disrobing and returning to live in the UK, Āloka matured his practice living on his own for a number of years in east London. Although he had been asked to travel and teach by his teacher in Sri Lanka, it was not until the publication of his first book that he took on this role, when he began leading retreats at centres of the Triratna Community in the UK and abroad. Āloka's association with the Triratna Community ended in 2006. It was during this time that the DharmaMind Buddhist Group was formed, whose formless practice is closely allied to that of Chinese Chán, Zen and Dzogchen.

The name Āloka can be translated as light, or as the Venerable Dhammaloka Maha Thera intended, ‘light of the dharma’.

Bibliography
 A Record of Awakening, Windhorse Publications, 1999 
 Dharma Mind, Worldly Mind, Aloka Publications, 2002
 The Five Pillars of Transformation, Aloka Publications, 2009 
 A Question of Dharma, Aloka Publications, 2008 
 Blue Sky, White Cloud, DharmaMind Publications, 2012

References

External links 
 Dharma talks on Vimeo
 Interview with Buddha at the Gas Pump

1946 births
People from Oxford
2015 deaths